Asperula pusilla, commonly known as alpine woodruff, is a species of flowering plant in the family Rubiaceae. It is a perennial herb that is endemic to Australia.

References

pusilla
Flora of New South Wales
Taxa named by Joseph Dalton Hooker
Plants described in 1847